The unification of Moldova and Romania is a popular concept in the two countries that began during the Revolutions of 1989. The Romanian Revolution in 1989 and the independence of Moldova in 1991 further contributed to the development of a movement for the unification of the two Romanian-speaking countries. The question of reunification is recurrent in the public sphere of the two countries, often as a speculation, both as a goal and a danger. Though historically Romanian support for unification was high, a 2022 survey during the Russo-Ukrainian War indicated that only 11% of Romania's population supports an immediate union, while over 42% think it is not the moment.

A majority in Moldova continues to oppose it. However, support in Moldova for reunification has increased significantly, with polls asking "if a referendum took place next Sunday regarding the unification of the Republic of Moldova and Romania, would you vote for or against the unification?" rising from approximately 20% to 44% support from 2015 to 2022. Support for unification with Romania is much lower in Transnistria and Gagauzia than in the rest of Moldova.

Individuals who advocate the unification are usually called "unionists". The supporters of the union may refer to the opponents as "Moldovenists". When referring to themselves as a group, opponents of the unification sometimes use the term "Statalists".

Background

The Principality of Moldavia was a vassal state of the Ottoman Empire and its eastern territories between the Prut and the Dniestr (approximately half of the principality) were annexed by the Russian Empire in 1812, in accordance with the Treaty of Bucharest. The Russians referred to this new region as Bessarabia, taking a name that had previously only applied to a southern portion of the region (known also as the "Budjak") and extending it to cover the entire newly annexed territory. The name derives from the Wallachian Basarab dynasty, who had presided over the southern portion in the Middle Ages. During the Russian Revolution of 1917, a newly formed regional parliament (Sfatul Țării) declared Bessarabia's autonomy within Russia. In 1918, after the Romanian army entered Bessarabia, the makeshift parliament decided on independence, only to review its position and ultimately decide on a conditional union with Romania. The conditions, including the provisions for autonomy, were ultimately dropped. This unification is now commemorated by unionists in Romania and Moldova as the Day of the Union of Bessarabia with Romania on 27 March.

In 1940, during World War II, Romania agreed to an ultimatum and ceded Moldova to the Soviet Union, which organized it into the Moldavian SSR.  In the middle of 1941, Romania joined the Axis Powers in the invasion of the Soviet Union, recovering Bessarabia and northern Bukovina, as well as occupying the territory to the east of the Dniester it dubbed "Transnistria". By the end of World War II, the Soviet Union had reconquered all of the lost territories, reestablishing Soviet authority there. The Soviets strongly promoted the Moldovan ethnic identity, against other opinions that viewed all speakers of the Romanian language as part of a single ethnic group, taking advantage of the incomplete integration of Bessarabia into the interwar Romania.

The official Soviet policy also stated that Romanian and Moldovan were two different languages and, to emphasize this distinction, Moldovan had to be written in a new Cyrillic alphabet (the Moldovan Cyrillic alphabet) based on the reformed Russian Cyrillic, rather than the obsolete Romanian Cyrillic alphabet that ceased to be used in the 19th century in the Old Kingdom and 1917 in Bessarabia.

Developments after 1989

In September 1989, with the liberalization in the Soviet Union, the parliament of the Moldovan SSR declared Moldovan as the official language, and asserted the existence of a "Moldovan-Romanian linguistic identity".

On 6 May 1990, after several decades of strict separation, Romania and the Moldovan SSR temporarily lifted border crossing restrictions, and thousands of people crossed the Prut River which marked their common border.

The factors hindering the unification were complex, ranging from the caution of political leaders in Moldova and Romania, the war in Transnistria, and, perhaps more importantly, the mentality of large parts of the population in Moldova (and to some extent in Romania) who were indifferent or opposed to such a project. In his address to the Romanian parliament, in February 1991, Moldova's first President Mircea Snegur spoke of a common identity of Moldovans and Romanians, referring to the "Romanians of both sides of the Prut River". In June 1991, Snegur talked about Moldova moving toward the reunification with Romania, adding that the Soviet Union is not making great efforts to stop it.

While many Moldovan intellectuals supported the union and wanted a "reunion with the Romanian motherland", there was little popular support for it, with more than 70% of the Moldovans opposing it, according to a 1992 poll. At the same time, Transnistria, the eastern part of Moldova, inhabited by a Moldovians, Russians, Ukrainians approximately in the same proportions, used the putative danger of unification with Romania as a pretext for its own aspirations for staying with Russia.

One June 26, 1991, at the request of Larry Pressler, the American Senate adopted a resolution which supported the unification of Moldova and Northern Bukovina with Romania.

Political ties and unionism
Following the declaration of independence on 27 August 1991, the Romanian flag defaced with the Moldovan coat of arms and the Romanian anthem "Deșteaptă-te, române!" became the symbols of the new independent Moldova. Following the growing tension between the pro-union governing Moldovan Popular Front and president Snegur, in particular over unification, the president moved closer to the Moldovanist group of Agrarians, and appointed their candidate Andrei Sangheli as prime minister. As a result, and especially after the victory of Agrarians in the 1994 elections, Moldova began distancing itself from Romania. The state flag was slightly modified, and the anthem changed to "Limba noastră". The Moldovan referendum of 1994 for an independent Moldova was seen by many public figures to be aimed at implicitly excluding a union with Romania. Furthermore, the constitution adopted in 1994 by the new Parliament dominated by Moldovanist Agrarians and Socialists called the official language "Moldovan", as opposed to the earlier Declaration of independence that called it "Romanian". The attempt by Moldovan president Mircea Snegur in 1996 to change the name of the official language to "Romanian" was dismissed by the Moldovan Parliament as "promoting Romanian expansionism".

In an interview, former Romanian President Ion Iliescu, who is criticized for failing to unify Romania with Moldova as soon as the latter declared its independence from the Soviet Union, explained that Romania alone, without international support (including from the Western countries) and without the wish of the politicians in Chișinău, was unable to achieve this unification.

A "Concept on National Policy" was adopted in 2003 by the Communist dominated Parliament, stating that Moldovans and Romanians are different peoples, and that the latter are an ethnic minority in Moldova.

Before 2005, only the Christian-Democratic People's Party, one of the political heirs of the Moldovan Popular Front, actively supported unification. However, the stance of the Christian-Democrats changed significantly after they started collaborating closely with the ruling Moldovan Communists. During the elections of April 2009, the alliance of National Liberal Party (Partidul Național Liberal) and the European Action Movement (Mișcarea Acțiunea Europeană) ran on a common platform of a loose union with Romania, but accumulated only around 1% of the votes.

On March 2 2023, the Moldovan parliament voted the change of the state language from Moldovan to Romanian. The idea was supported by the ruling Party of Action and Solidarity and was strongly opposed by the Bloc of Communists and Socialists. The Academy of Sciences of Moldova also supported this decision.

Political commentary
In 2004 and later, the Romanian newspaper Ziua published a series of articles and interviews with Stanislav Belkovsky, an influential Russian political commentator, who proposed a plan of a unification of Romania and Moldova excluding Transnistria. Speculations followed whether his plan is backed by higher circles in the Kremlin, but they were never confirmed. Nevertheless, several journalists and scholars dismissed the plan as a diversion, also pointing out several ambiguities, such as the status of the city of Bender situated on the right bank of Dniester but under Transnistrian control, and, more importantly, the unlikelihood of Moldova's acquiescence to such a plan.

In January 2006, the Romanian president Traian Băsescu declared that he strongly supported the Moldovan bid for joining the European Union and that "the minimal policy of Romania is for the unification of the Romanian nation to take place within the EU". The phrase "minimal policy" led to questions whether there is also a maximal policy. In July of the same year, Băsescu claimed to have  made a proposal to the Moldovan president Vladimir Voronin that "Moldova join the EU together with Romania in 2007" and that the alleged offer was rejected. Băsescu also added that Romania would respect this decision and would help Moldova to join EU on its own.

In October 2006 the Romanian newspaper Cotidianul estimated the cost of a union with Moldova at €30–35 billion, and attracted criticism from the Romanian newspaper Ziua, as well as Timpul for exaggerating the costs and disregarding other dimensions of a possible union.

After the Moldovan parliamentary election of April 2009, the 2009 Moldova civil unrest, the Moldovan parliamentary election of July 2009 and the creation of the governing Alliance for European Integration, a new wave of speculations about the union followed. The Party of Communists, now in opposition, claimed "the unionists came to power." In a November 2009 interview, political commentator Stanislav Belkovsky declared that the April 2009 election marked the beginning of the process of Moldova's return to Romania.

Traian Băsescu made a state visit to Moldova along with a number of ministers to announce several projects that would intensify ties between the two countries, and the offer of 100 million euro grant for infrastructure projects. Băsescu called Moldova his "soul project". Private Romanian investments are also expected to increase significantly, with the opening of a Moldovan-Romanian business and investment office, and the takeover of the online news portal Unimedia by Romanian group Realitatea-Cațavencu group, owned by businessman Sorin Ovidiu Vântu.

On 15 February 2010, the Lipcani-Rădăuți border crossing between Romania and Moldova opened and the remnant Soviet barbed wire fence on the Moldovan side of the border with Romania was dismantled.

In January 2010, Mircea Druc, the former prime minister of Moldova between 1990 and 1991, declared that the unification of Romania and the Republic of Moldova is inevitable. A similar statement was also made by Russian political analyst Vladimir Bruter and by the pro-Russian Moldovan commentator Zurab Todua, both claiming in a Russian TV Show that the split of the Romanian people is a "tragedy", and, if the people want the unification of the 2 countries, it will happen and the global powers can't oppose it. However, acting President Mihai Ghimpu denied in an interview with the Russian language newspaper Komsomolskaya Pravda v Moldove that such a move will be taken, stating that a union is not included in the program of the governing coalition. On another occasion he declared that if the people wanted unification, neither he, nor anyone else could stop them. He admitted on several occasions to personally share unionist views. However, in August 2010 he declared that the proposition of an "inter-state union" between Romania and Moldova was "a very stupid" idea.

On 27 November 2013, a day before participation in the Eastern Partnership Summit in Vilnius, Romanian President Traian Băsescu was invited to an interview at the national TV station, TVR. There he said that the third priority for Romania, after joining NATO and the EU, must be the union with Moldova. "I'm convinced that if there is a unionist current in Moldova, Romania will say 'yes' without hesitation", stated the Head of State. In present, Romania supports the full integration of Moldova into the EU. The Mayor of Chișinău Dorin Chirtoacă welcomed the statements made by Băsescu. On the other hand, the Moldovan prime-minister, Iurie Leancă, described Băsescu's declaration as "creating crucial problems" for Moldova and affirmed his government's support for a sovereign Moldova. Positions similar to Leancă's were taken by the other leaders of the pro-European ruling coalition, Vlad Filat and Marian Lupu, as well as by Vladimir Voronin, leader of the main opposition party. However, in the latter years, Filat and Leancă became supporters of the unification, due to rapid development of the Romanian economy. 

In august 2016, American ambassador to Moldova, James Pettit, declared that Moldova is not Romania and that the Moldovan people have their own history and identity. He also added that Moldova should join the European Union as an independent state. He later declared, in September 2016, after a meeting with the Moldovan unionist politician Mihai Ghimpu, that he respects the unionists' ideal and the natural desire of Moldovans to unite with Romania. In 2018, Romanian historian Mircea Dogaru wrote a public letter to Pettit, criticising his anti-unionist position.

Historian Victor Stepaniuc, known for his Moldovenist position, stated in 2016 that if Moldova cannot succeed as an independent state, then the only solution is the unification with Romania.

In 2017, Dumitru Diacov (founder and honorary president of the Democratic Party of Moldova) said that the unification project is unrealistic at present, and that unification will probably be possible in 100 years.

Petrișor Peiu (professor at Politehnica University of Bucharest, known for being a unionist advocate) criticized the lack of unionist elements in the speech of Romanian leaders (such as Klaus Iohannis), focusing exclusively on "European integration", not on reunification. He also claimed that he asked Romanian politicians why they don't support the unification, and they answered: "Germany doesn't want it". At the same time, Oana Ursache (USR PLUS), state secretary of the Department for Romanians everywhere, cut off the financing of "Mesager bucovinean", one of the most important newspapers for the Romanian community in Ukraine. Furthermore, during the 2021 Moldovan elections, Romanian defense minister Nicolae Ciucă (PNL) stated that, between unification with Romania and the European integration, Romania supports Moldova's European integration as a sovereign state. In November 2021, Moldovan foreign minister Nicu Popescu said that most of the Moldovan citizens don't support a unification with Romania, and that he also supports an independent Moldovan state.

Following the 2022 Russian invasion of Ukraine, the idea of a union of Moldova with Romania has again become a topic discussed in the press. Supporters of the idea (such as the Romanian historian Marius Oprea) argue that the unification would strengthen NATO's eastern flank and defend Moldova in the event of an escalation of the Transnistrian conflict. Former Moldovan Prime Minister Iurie Leancă said that the only way Moldova can be protected from Russia is to unite with Romania. On the other hand, Moldovan President Maia Sandu said that the Union with Romania can be achieved only if the Moldovan population wants it. Asked about what he thinks about the unification in the new context, Moldovan foreign minister Nicu Popescu stated that only the Moldovan people can decide their future. Furthermore, Moldovan Prime Minister Natalia Gavrilița said the unification with Romania is not being taken into account. She also said that Moldova wants to join the European Union, but not NATO.

In January 2023, Russian deputies Leonid Kalashnikov and Svetlana Zhurova warned that Moldova's intentions to unite with Romania, and thus joining NATO, may lead to its destruction. On 2 February 2023, Russian foreign minister Sergey Lavrov declared that Moldova might have Ukraine's fate (meaning to be attacked by Russia) if the Moldovan president Maia Sandu, who has Romanian citizenship, wants Moldova to unite with Romania and join NATO.

Several political and public figures in Romania have said that Maia Sandu could run for the presidency of Romania in 2024, similarly to Alexandru Ioan Cuza, having Romanian citizenship, citing Sandu's popularity among the Romanian population, thus achieving a de facto unification. On 16 February 2023, Sandu adressed this issue, stating she has no intention of running for any office in Romania.

Current trends

Dual citizenship for Moldovan citizens
A poll conducted by IPP Chișinău in November 2007 shows that 33.6% of the Moldovan population is interested in holding Romanian citizenship, while 58.8% is not interested. The main reason of those interested is: feeling Romanian (31.9%), the possibility of traveling to Romania (48.9%), and the possibility of traveling and/or working in the EU (17.2%).

Between 1991 and 2009, some 140,000 Moldovan citizens obtained Romanian citizenship. According to some estimates, as many as 1 million Moldovan citizens requested Romanian citizenship by 2009. In 2010, the Romanian government created the National Authority for Citizenship to process the large number of applications for Romanian citizenship coming especially from Moldovan citizens. The study "Reacquiring Romanian citizenship: historical, comparative and applied perspectives", released in 2012, estimated that 226,507 Moldovan citizens reacquired Romanian citizenship by 15 August 2011 Between 15 August 2011 and 15 October 2012, an additional 90,000 reacquired Romanian citizenship, according to the National Authority for Citizenship, bringing the total to 320,000.

A 2013 study by the Soros Foundation Romania found that from the passing of the citizenship law in 1991 until the end of 2012, the number of successful applications from Moldova was 323,049. This is an increase of 96,542 successful applications since 15 August 2011. In the same period, the number of applications was 449,783, meaning that around 125,000 applications still need to be finalised. In 2011 and 2012, 100,845 and 87,015 applications were submitted respectively. The actual number of persons granted citizenship in these applications remains unclear because each application may include minors dependent on the adult filing. The number of persons is estimated to be around 400,000, with a potential of 150,000 more persons if all outstanding applications are successful.

Between 1 January 2010 and 5 November 2021 as many as 1,027,091 Moldovan citizens acquired Romanian citizenship, of which 746,695 adults and 280,396 minors.

Action 2012

In April 2011, a coalition of NGOs from Romania and Moldova created the civic platform Action 2012, whose aim is to "raise awareness of the necessity of the unification between Romania and the Republic of Moldova". Year 2012 was chosen as a reference to the bicentennial commemoration of the 1812 division of historical Moldavia, when the Russian Empire annexed what would later be called Bessarabia. The proponents see the unification as a reversal of this historical division, a reversal inspired by the rather short-lived Union of Bessarabia with Romania (1918–1940) disrupted by the Soviet occupation.

Union Council
In February 2012, the Union Council was created to "gather all unionists" in order to "promote the idea of Romanian national unity". Among the signatories: Mircea Druc former Moldovan prime-minister, Alexandru Mosanu former speaker of the Moldovan Parliament, Vitalia Pavlicenco president of the Moldovan National Liberal Party, Vladimir Beșleagă writer, Constantin Tănase director of the Moldovan newspaper Timpul de dimineață, Val Butnaru president of Jurnal Trust Media, Oleg Brega journalist and activist, Nicu Țărnă soloist of the Moldovan rock band Gândul Mâței, and Tudor Ionescu, president of the Romanian neo-fascist association Noua Dreaptă, Valentin Dolganiuc, former Moldovan MP, Eugenia Duca, Moldovan businesswoman, Anton Moraru, Moldovan professor of history, Eugen Mihalache, vice president of People's Party, Dan Diaconescu and others.

National Unity Bloc (BUN)

Created on May 16, 2015, as a coalition of 30 NGO
Support unification of Republic of Moldova with Romania
Head Persons: Ion Leascenco (actual leader), Anatol Ursu, Constantin Codreanu (former leader), Oleg Chicu, Lucia Vieru, Vitalie Prisacaru, Artemis Balan, Claudia Iovita

Sfatul Țării 2
On March 27, 2016, the unionists formed the "Sfatul Țării 2", self-proclaimed successor of Sfatul Țării. It included representatives of each district, as well as representatives of ethnic-religious minorities. At the end of the meeting, symbolically, the "declaration of the reunification of Moldova with Romania" was adopted. Among the participants there were Nicolae Dabija, Mircea Druc, Ion Ungureanu, Alexandru Moșanu, Alecu Reniță, Mihai Cimpoi, Ion Negrei, Eugen Doga, Arcadie Suceveanu, Nicolae Botgros, Ion Varta, Petru Hadârcă, Iurie Colesnic, Gheorghe Mustea, Ninela Caranfil, Ion Iovcev, Octavian Țîcu, Sandu Grecu, Vasile Iovu, Petru Bogatu, Vladimir Beșleagă and Silviu Tănase.

Union marches

The newly created Action 2012 and Union Council initiative groups organized several manifestations in support of the unification throughout 2012. The first one was a rally of 2,000 to 3,000 people in Chișinău on 25 March 2012, held as an anniversary of the Union of Bessarabia with Romania on 27 March 1918. Larger rallies took place on 13 May (which commemorated 200 years of the 1812 Treaty of Bucharest and the first Russian annexation of Bessarabia) and on 16 September. A union march was also held in Bucharest in October 2012 and was attended by several thousand people. Smaller-scale manifestations took place in the Moldovan cities of Cahul and Bălți on 22 July and 5 August respectively. Various intellectuals and artists from both countries supported the marches, while Moldovan Speaker Marian Lupu and Prime Minister Vlad Filat opposed them. The rallies in Bucharest were later repeated in October 2013 and October 2014. Also, in September 2014, another rally took place in Chișinău, during which a 300-metre long Romanian flag was carried through the central street of the city. On 16 May 2015, between 5,000 (police estimates) and 25,000 people (organizers' estimate) demonstrated for unification in Chișinău, in what has been claimed to be the largest pro-Romanian protests since the 1990s. Another protest, attracting between 5,000 and 30,000 people (organizers' claim), took place on 5 July 2015 in Chișinău. Around a thousand young people from among the participants headed to Bucharest in the "March of Stephen the Great" calling for the unification of Moldova with Romania. The march lasted a week, from 5 to 11 July. In the Republic of Moldova, the march followed the route Strășeni–Lozova–Călărași–Cornești–Ungheni. Participants crossed the Prut River, on 11 July at 10 a.m., in a large-scale reenactment of the Bridges of Flowers in 1990. Their march ended in Bucharest, where were greeted by several hundred Romanian citizens in University Square, before making their way to the Cotroceni Palace to call on Romanian President Klaus Iohannis to support the unification project. Former Moldovan President Vladimir Voronin has sharply condemned the march to Romania. In a letter to European Parliament President Martin Schulz, released on 7 July, Voronin accused Bucharest of fomenting "the destruction and annexation of Moldova".

On 22 September 2015, the Governments of Romania and the Republic of Moldova held a bilateral reunion in Neptun, Constanța county, where over 300 unionists demonstrated. Their representatives obtained access to the meeting, discussing with the Minister of Foreign Affairs about common projects. The unionists announced the "Reunification Agenda 2018", some of their claims being accepted and decided within the intergovernmental meeting.

In 2018, centennial celebration of the Great Union, a demonstration called the Centenary March was organized by several Romanian and Moldovan activists for unification. It started in Alba Iulia on 1 July 2018 and ended in Chișinău on 1 September 2018. One of its main objectives was to achieve the unification of Moldova with Romania. The participants tried to collect 1 million signatures for the organization of a referendum. Although at first the Moldovan authorities prohibited the participants to cross the border, they were allowed to enter later.

Public opinion

Moldova
The International Republican Institute in partnership with Gallup, Inc. regularly conducts polls in the Republic of Moldova on several social and political issues. The following results reflect the public stance in Moldova on the question of reunification:

A poll conducted by IRI in Moldova in November 2008 showed that 29% of the population would support a union with Romania, while 61% would reject it.

The pro-Unionist NGO "Romanian Centre of Strategic Studies" published reports claiming significantly higher support for the idea:

The Public Opinion Barometer (BOP), released twice a year in Moldova at the initiative of IPP (Institute of Public Policy), included beginning with its November 2015 edition a question about the reunification

The Socio-Political Barometer, released several times a year by IMAS Moldova, also included the question about the reunification

The polls conducted by FOP presented the following results

The company iData has regularly included a question about unification in its polls. One from the second half of March 2021, with 1,314 participants, stated that 43.9% of Moldova would vote to reuniting with Romania if given a referendum within a week, and 67.8% of Moldova wanted to join the European Union (EU). Another poll from the same company, conducted between May 19–28 of 2021, with 1,227 participants, determined that 41.6% of Moldova would vote to unite with Romania if given a referendum within a week, and 67.3% of Moldova supported joining the EU.

Another poll was organized in June 2021 by a group of several companies. On it, 35.0% of Moldovans said they would vote for unification with Romania and 47.3% said they would vote against. The number of people in favor of the unification increased to 41.2% as shown by a poll from iData made between 21 and 28 July 2021 with 1,065 participants, including some from Transnistria. The collaboration between the two countries during the COVID-19 pandemic has also led to an increase in the number of supporters of the unification.

In September 2021, iData made a new poll, in which 70% of Moldovans expressed their desire to join the European Union and in which 40% of Moldovans declared they supported the unification of Moldova and Romania. In October 2021, 43.8% of participants of a poll of the same company voted for the unification with Romania, this number being 41.2% in a November 2021 poll.

A January 2022 poll from iData showed that 38.4% of Moldovans would support unification with Romania. Later, a January–February 2022 poll by CBS Research showed that 34.4% of Moldovans would want to unite with Romania and that 49.9% would oppose this. A posterior poll conducted between 27 April and 6 May 2022 showed 35.2% of Moldovans favored union while 50.6% opposed it. Another poll made between 5 May and 14 May showed 34.7% of Moldovans supported union and 49.7% of them opposed it.

In May 2022, a poll in Moldova found that 30.7% supported reunification, while 27.1% were in favour of recognizing Transnistria's independence. In June 2022, another Moldovan poll found 35.2% supported unification. In September 2022, 34.6% of Moldovans did so. This increased to 39.7% in a 29 September–11 October poll, believed to be because of changes in Romanian legislation that allowed the sale of electricity to Moldova at preferential prices to combat the country's energy crisis at the time. According to a poll conducted between 16 and 23 November, 42.5% of Moldovans would vote in favor and 57.5% against.

Romania
A poll conducted in November–December 2010 and extensively analyzed in the study The Republic of Moldova in the Romanian public awareness (Republica Moldova în conștiința publică românească) addressed the issue of reunification.

A similar survey carried out in Romania in June 2012 by the Romanian Centre of Strategic Studies showed the following results:

According to a poll conducted by the Romanian Institute for Evaluation and Strategy (IRES) on 29 November 2013, 76% of Romanians agree with the union of Romania and Moldova, while only 18% oppose a possible union.

A poll by INSCOP, conducted between 9–14 July 2015, asked about the unification by 2018.

Impact of a unification scenario
The Republic of Moldova would bring an addition of 2.6 million inhabitants and an increase in Gross Domestic Product (GDP) of US$12.7billion (4.8% of Romania's GDP) to Romania. However, GDP per capita would fall to $14,400, as the current Romanian GDP per capita is estimated at US$15,980, while the Moldovan GDP per capita stands at US$3,700. It is estimated that unification would cost US$10 billion, that Moldova would be able to cover a US$1.5 billion, and that Romania would have to cover the US$8.5 billion difference. It has been proposed that the European Union would cover part of the cost.

If Moldova decided to unite with Romania, the status of Gagauzia, a "national-territorial autonomous unit" of Moldova with three official languages (Romanian, Gagauz, and Russian), would be unclear. While the autonomy of Gagauzia is guaranteed by the Moldovan constitution and regulated by the 1994 Gagauz Autonomy Act, the laws of Romania do not permit ethnic-based territorial autonomy and any other official language than Romanian. The selection of a capital city would also be in question.

When it comes to Transnistria, a non-recognised self-proclaimed state with three official languages (Moldovan, Russian, and Ukrainian), it is not clear what would happen upon unification. In fact, the popularity of unification idea contributed to the outbreak of the Transnistria War in 1992, when Transnistria declared independence from Moldova. The UN still recognizes Transnistria as part of Moldova. One version of the unification proposal would exclude Transnistria.

Unification scenarios
There are several possible scenarios for a possible unification of Moldavia with Romania: 
The political Union of the Republic of Moldova and Romania by merging into a single state, into the present "de jure" (legal) borders (which implies the new state taking over Transnistria as a territorial unit without considerations for the Russian military presence in the area) and regardless of the political and administrative situation of the current territorial units, which can be preserved or reformed within the new state;
Political Union of the Republic of Moldova and Romania by merging it into one state, at the current "de facto" borders (which implies the new state giving up the territory controlled by the breakaway state of Transnistria, which will then have a choice between independence, joining Ukraine or joining Russia: This was called by the press "Belkovsky Plan"). Romania could also give Transnistria to Ukraine, receiving an equal share in the area of Chernivtsi Oblast or Odessa Oblast, where important communities of Romanians exist.
The political Union of the Republic of Moldova and Romania by federalization of the two States (which would keep the political sovereignty of each states) in an economic, monetary, customs and military community (this option is inspired by Mircea Snegur's "one people, two States" idea).

Supporters of unification

Republic of Moldova

Political parties
 Christian-Democratic People's Party (PPCD)
Liberal Democratic Party of Moldova (PLDM), declared as aim the proposed union with Romania by 10 September 2018.
National Unity Party (PUN)
Mișcarea Politică Unirea (MPU)
Liberal Party (PL)
National Liberal Party (PNL)
Romanian Popular Party (PPR)
Save Bessarabia Union (USB)
Democracy at Home Party (PPDA)
Unionist Movement of the Republic of Moldova (MURM)
 
Democratic Action Party

Political figures
Vlad Bilețchi, civic activist, head of ODIP NGO, part of National Unity Bloc (BUN), president of the Moldovan branch of the Alliance for the Union of Romanians
Dorin Chirtoacă, Mayor of Chișinău (2007–2017), president of Liberal Party (PL) and Mișcarea Politică Unirea (MPU)
, Moldovan and Romanian politician, Romanian MP, member of PUN and of PMP
Vasile Costiuc, historian, journalist and president of the Democracy at Home Party (PPDA)
Tudor Deliu, politician, professor, associate professor, lecturer and former president of the Liberal Democratic Party of Moldova (PLDM)
Mircea Druc, Moldovan and Romanian politician, former Prime Minister of Moldova (1990–1991)
Gheorghe Ghimpu, political prisoner in Soviet Union, one of the leaders who fought for the independence of the Republic of Moldova and reunification with Romania
Mihai Ghimpu, former president of Liberal Party (PL), former interim President of Moldova (2009–2010)
Ana Guțu, professor of philology, vicepresident of the National Unity Party (PUN)
Ion Leașcenco, politician and civic activist, head of the National Unity Bloc (BUN)
Ilie Ilașcu, Moldovan and Romanian politician, victim of the Transnistrian regime
Valeriu Munteanu, president of Save Bessarabia Union (USB)
Vitalia Pavlicenco, president of National Liberal Party (PNL)
Alecu Reniță, president of Ecological Movement of Moldova
John Onoje, Sierra Leonean-born Moldovan politician
Maia Sandu, politician and economist, current President of Moldova (since 2020)
Anatol Șalaru, general secretary and former president of National Unity Party (PUN), former Minister of Defence of Republic of Moldova and founder of the National Liberal Party (PNL)
Octavian Țîcu, president of National Unity Party, historian and former professional boxer
Anatol Ursu, politician and civic activist, member of Romanian Popular Party (PPR)
Mihai Cimpoi, politician, cultural scientist, academician
Veaceslav Untilă, politician, member of Liberal Party
Nicolae Timofti, former President of Republic of Moldova
Vlad Filat, politician and businessman, former Prime-minister of Moldova
Ion Costaș, military general and politician
Veaceslav Platon, politician
Dinu Plîngău, politician, member of Dignity and Truth Platform Party
Vlad Cubreacov, politician
Alexandru Moșanu, politician, historian and academician, 1st president of the Moldovan Parliament
Valentin Dolganiuc, politician, founder of Dignity and Truth Platform Party
Ion Sturza, politician and businessman, former Prime Minister of Moldova
Iurie Leancă, politician, former Prime Minister of Moldova, member of European People's Party of Moldova and of PRO Romania
Anatol Petrencu, historian, politician
Valeriu Muravschi, politician, former Prime Minister of Moldova
Nicolae Andronic, politician
Sergiu Mocanu, politician, president of the Antifa People's Movement
Valeriu Matei, politician, writer, academician
Vasile Șoimaru, politician
Nicolae Costin, politician, former mayor of Chișinău
Ion Hadârcă, writer, translator and politician, founder of the Popular Front of Moldova, former member of Moldovan Parliament, former member of the Senate of Romania
Ion Varta, historian and politician
Valeriu Graur, political prisoner in the Soviet Union, one of the founders of the National Patriotic Front
Alexandru Usatiuc-Bulgăr, political prisoner in the Soviet Union, one of the founders of the National Patriotic Front
Alexandru Șoltoianu, political prisoner in the Soviet Union, one of the founders of the National Patriotic Front
Călin Vieru, politician, physician, son of poet Grigore Vieru
Ion Vatamanu, chemist, writer and politician
Monica Babuc, politician, historian, former Minister of Education
Ion Leucă, politician
Ghenadie Buza, politician
Oazu Nantoi, politician
Ion Cebanu, politician, former Minister of Youth and Sports
Gheorghe Brega, physician, politician, former Deputy Prime Minister for Social Affairs of Moldova
Sergiu Burcă, journalist, politician
Leonida Lari, poet, journalist, politician, former member of the Parliament of Romania (1992-2008) and of the Supreme Soviet of the Soviet Union (1989-1991)
Mihai Coșcodan, scientist, politician
Chiril Gaburici, politician, former Minister of Economy and former Prime Minister of Moldova
Iacob Golovcă, civic activist, leader of the Anti-Molotov-Ribbentrop Pact Association
Iurie Colesnic, technical literature corrector, former publishing director, literary historian, politician and writer
Pavel Filip, engineer, politician, former Prime Minister of Moldova
Alexandru Tănase, jurist, politician former president of the Constitutional Court of the Republic of Moldova, former Minister of Justice
Oleg Bodrug, physicist, politician
Vladimir Plahotniuc, businessman, philanthropist, politician
Andrian Candu, jurist, politician, former President of the Moldovan Parliament
Tatiana Potîng, politician, former Deputy Prime Minister of Moldova
Vladimir Solonari, politician, historian
Mihai Godea, historian, politician, former member of the Moldovan Parliament
Sergiu Prodan, politician, film director, current Minister of culture
Anatolie Dimitriu, president of Ialoveni district (since 2015)
Nadejda Brânzan, physician, politician, former member of Moldovan Parliament
Alexandru Arseni, politician, jurist, professor
Igor Munteanu, politician and diplomat, former Moldovan Ambassador to the United States, Canada and Mexico, former member of the Moldovan Parliament
Lilian Carp, politician and professor, member of the Moldovan Parliament

Artists
Grigore Vieru, poet and writer
Eugen Doga, composer
Nicu Țărnă, musician, actor, songwriter, showman, and TV presenter
Nicolae Dabija, writer and academician
Ion Ungureanu, actor, former member of the Popular Front of Moldova, 1st Moldovan minister of Culture and Cults
Vladimir Beșleagă, writer
Aurelian Silvestru, writer and activist
Dumitru Matcovschi, writer and poet
Leo Butnaru, writer and poet
Valentin Mândâcanu, writer, founding member of the Popular Front of Moldova
Doina and Ion Aldea Teodorovici, musical duo
Andrei Țurcanu, writer
Nicolai Costenco, writer and poet
Gheorghe Vodă, poet and film director
Serafim Saka, writer
Nicolae Botgros, violinist, conductor
Ion Suruceanu, singer
Ion Ciocanu, literary critic
Iulian Filip, writer
Valentina Rusu-Ciobanu, painter
Mihai Volontir, actor
Emil Loteanu, film director, actor and writer
Efim Tarlapan, writer
Silviu Berejan, linguist, writer, academician
Zdob și Zdub, rock band
Ion Moraru, activist and author, founder of the anti-Soviet group Sabia Dreptății and a political prisoner in the Soviet Union
Victor Buruiană, musician, composer, guitarist
Gheorghe Urschi, actor, director, humorist
Aureliu Busuioc, writer, journalist and poet
Gheorghe Erizanu, writer
Ricky Ardezianu, singer
Spiridon Vangheli, writer

Others
Petru Bogatu, journalist
Nicolae Lupan, journalist, former member of the National Patriotic Front
Anatol Vidrașcu, editor
Peter Păduraru, Metropolitan of Bessarabia
Ion Ciuntu, priest
Oleg Brega, journalist, activist, filmmaker, member of Democracy at Home Party and of the Green Party
Petru Soltan, mathematician, member of the Academy of Sciences of Moldova and an honorary member of the Romanian Academy
Ion Țurcanu, historian
Gheorghe E. Cojocaru, historian
Eugenio Coșeriu, linguist
Petru Buburuz, Orthodox priest and journalist

Romania

Political parties
Alliance for the Union of Romanians (AUR)
People's Movement Party (PMP)
United Romania Party (PRU)
Greater Romania Party (PRM)
Noua Dreaptă (ND)
Romanian Nationhood Party (NR)
The Right Alternative (ADR)

Political figures
Traian Băsescu, President of Romania (2004–2014)
Florin Călinescu, politician, actor, theatre director and television host, President of the Green Party
, politician, Mayor of Iași
Dacian Cioloș, Prime Minister of Romania (2015–2017), president of the Save Romania Union, leader of Renew Europe
Nicușor Dan, civic activist, mathematician, politician, and former party leader of Save Romania Union (USR)
Liviu Dragnea, politician, former President of the Social Democratic Party (PSD), President of the Chamber of Deputies (2016–2019)
, politician and historian, MP, member of Romanian National Liberal Party (PNL)
Ramona Mănescu, National Liberal MEP (2007–2013), Romanian Transport Minister (2013–2014) and Foreign Affairs Minister (July–November 2019)
Mihail Neamțu, philosopher, theologian and writer, founder of New Republic political party
Norica Nicolai, MEP (2009–2019)
Ludovic Orban, politician, former president of the Romanian National Liberal Party (PNL) (2017-2021), former Prime Minister of Romania (2019–2020)
Theodor Paleologu, historian, diplomat and politician, Minister of Culture of Romania (2008–2009), formerly a member of the National Liberal Party (PNL), the People's Movement Party (PMP), and the Democratic Liberal Party (PDL)
, politician, informatician, and matematician, MP on behalf of the Armenian minority
Victor Ponta, jurist and politician, Prime Minister of Romania (2012–2015), former President of the Social Democratic Party (PSD), President of PRO Romania
Călin Popescu-Tăriceanu, politician, Prime Minister of Romania (2004–2008), President of the Alliance of Liberals and Democrats (ALDE)
 George Simion, politician, writer and civic activist; president of the Alliance for the Union of Romanians (AUR)
Eugen Tomac, politician, historian and journalist, President of the People's Movement Party (PMP)
Varujan Vosganian, economist, politician, writer, Romanian Minister of Economy and Commerce (2006–2008), and Minister of Economy and Finance (2007–2008)
Dan Barna, politician, former president of the Save Romania Union
Corneliu Coposu, politician, political detainee during the communist regime
Klaus Iohannis, current president of Romania (since 2014)
Theodor Stolojan, politician, former prime minister of Romania
Mircea Diaconu, actor and politician, former member of the European Parliament
Dan Diaconescu, politician and journalist, former president of People's Party - Dan Diaconescu
Corneliu Vadim Tudor, politician
Teodor Meleșcanu, politician, diplomat
Adrian Papahagi, philologist, politician, founding member of The Right Alternative
Rareș Bogdan, politician, journalist, MEP (since 2019)
Adrian Năstase, diplomat, politician, jurist, former Prime Minister of Romania
Ion Coja, philologist, politician
George Pruteanu, literary critic and politician
Mircea Chelaru, general, historian, essaist politician, former Chief of the Romanian General Staff
Ninel Peia, politician, leader of the Romanian Nationhood Party
Ion Rațiu, lawyer, diplomat, journalist, businessman, writer, and politician
Victor Ciorbea, lawyer, politician, former Prime Minister of Romania
Radu Vasile, historian, politician, former Prime Minister of Romania
Nicolae Văcăroiu, economist, politician, former Prime Minister of Romania
Claudiu Târziu, politician, journalist, former co-president of the Alliance for the Union of Romanians (AUR)
Emil Boc, current mayor of Cluj-Napoca, former Prime Minister of Romania
Gheorghe Buzatu, historian, politician
Cristian Diaconescu, jurist, politician, diplomat, leader of People's Movement Party (since 2021)
Crin Antonescu, historian, politician, former President of the Senate of Romania
Alexandru Mironov, science-fiction writer, journalist, politician, former Minister of Youth and Sport
Marcel Ciolacu, politician, President of the Social Democratic Party (PSD) and current President of the Chamber of Deputies of Romania (since 2021)
Marian Munteanu, politician
Vasile Dîncu, former Deputy Prime Minister of Romania
Mihai Șora, philosopher, essayist, politician, former Minister of Education
Diana Iovanovici Șoșoacă, lawyer, politician
Titus Corlățean, jurist, diplomat, politician, former Minister of Foreign Affairs
Anton Crihan, politician, lawyer, economist, former member of Sfatul Țării, former member of the Parliament of Romania
Gheorghe Funar, economist, politician, former mayor of Cluj-Napoca
Cozmin Gușă, physicist, journalist, politician
Ion Gheorghe Maurer, lawyer, diplomat and communist politician, former Prime Minister of Romania (1961-1974) and former President of the Presidium of the Great National Assembly (1958-1961)
Monica Macovei, lawyer, prosecutor, politician, former Minister of Justice (2004-2007), former Member of the European Parliament (2009-2019)
Emil Străinu, army general, politician, writer, journalist, ufologist, former president of Greater Romania Party

Artists 
Alexandru Arșinel, actor
Claudiu Bleonț, actor
Cheloo, Romanian rapper, member of Paraziții rap group.
Tudor Chirilă, actor, musician, composer, and producer
Tudor Gheorghe, singer, songwriter, and actor
Ovidiu Lipan, musician, composer, and drummer
Maia Morgenstern, actress
Florin Piersic, actor
Stela Popescu, actress
Rudy Rosenfeld, Romanian actor of Jewish descent, born in Chernivtsi (today in Ukraine)
Adrian Păunescu, poet
Fuego, musician
Paul Goma, writer, anticommunist dissident
Gheorghe Zamfir, Romanian nai musician
Grigore Leșe, musician
Anastasia Lazariuc, musician
Nicolae Covaci, rock musician, founder and leader of Transsylvania Phoenix
Vasile Șeicaru, musician
Ștefan Hrușcă, musician
Nicu Alifantis, musician
Emil Brumaru, writer, poet, physician
Ion Caramitru, actor, politician, former Minister of Culture
Sofia Vicoveanca, singer
Dan Bittman, rock musician, lead singer of Holograf
Dan Puric, actor, director, and pantomime artist
Marius Moga, composer, producer, singer
Radu Theodoru, writer, historian, military officer, former member of Greater Romania Party
Daniel Ioniță, poet and translator
Fără Zahăr, folk rock band

Sportspeople 
Mihai Leu, rally driver and retired boxer
Ruxandra Dragomir, tennis player
Andreea Răducan, Olympic gymnast
Camelia Potec, Olympic swimmer
Petru Toarcă, wrestler, born in Babele, Budjak, Ukraine
Cătălin Moroșanu, kickboxer

Others
Cristian Tudor Popescu, journalist
Patriarch Daniel of Romania, Patriarch of the Romanian Orthodox Church
Neagu Djuvara, (1916–2018), historian, essayist, philosopher, journalist, novelist, and diplomat
Michael I of Romania, (1921–2017), the last King of Romania
Adrian Cioroianu, historian, former Minister of Foreign Affairs
Dan Dungaciu, sociologist
Ioan-Aurel Pop, historian, President of the Romanian Academy (since 2018)
Margareta of Romania, head of House of Romania
Ion Cristoiu, journalist
Iosif Constantin Drăgan, businessman, billionaire, writer, historian, Dacianist, former member of the Iron Guard
Călin Georgescu, senior expert in sustainable development, former president of Club of Rome
Constantin Bălăceanu-Stolnici, neurologist, member of the Romanian Academy
Gleb Drăgan, academician, engineer, member of the Romanian Academy
Doru Braia, journalist
Mircea Badea, journalist, political satirist, television host, media critic, radio personality

Opponents of unification

Republic of Moldova

Political figures 
Igor Dodon, former President of Moldova
Vladimir Voronin, former President of Moldova
Renato Usatîi, former Mayor of Bălți
Ilan Șor, former Mayor of Orhei
Zinaida Greceanîi
Vadim Krasnoselsky, President of Transnistria
Mihail Garbuz, politician, president of Moldovan Patriots Party
Victor Șelin, president of Social Democratic Party of Moldova
Vasile Tarlev, former prime-minister of Moldova
Vadim Mișin, founder of Revival Party
Valerii Klimenko, founder and former president of Ravnopravie Movement
Aleksandr Petkov
Mark Tkaciuk
Grigore Petrenco, one of the leaders of the Moldovan Antifa Movement
Vlad Batrîncea, secretary of Party of Socialists of the Republic of Moldova
Alexandru Slusari
Iurie Muntean, politician, leader of the Collective Action Party - Civic Congress

Marian Lupu, former President of the Moldovan Parliament, former acting President of Moldova, chairman of Court of Accounts of Moldova
Nicolae Pascaru`
Vasile Stati, historian, politician
Irina Vlah, politician, current Governor of Găgăuzia
Stepan Topal, first Governor of Găgăuzia
Mihail Formuzal, politician, former Governor of Găgăuzia
Andrei Sangheli, 2nd Prime Minister of Moldova
Ion Morei, former Minister of Justice of Moldova
Oleg Babenco, historian, politician, founding member of Revival Party
Vladimir Țurcan, politician
Eduard Smirnov, politician
Vasili Panciuc, former mayor of Bălți
Oleg Reidman, politician
Eva Gudumac, physician, politician
Valentin Beniuc, politician, former Minister of Education
Reghina Apostolova
Dumitru Ciubașenco, journalist, politician
Vladimir Cîssa, politician, current president of Halk Topluşu
Dmitri Croitor, politician, former Governor of Gagauzia
Nicolai Dudoglo, former Mayor of Comrat
Dmitrii Constantinov, former president of Halk Topluşu
Victor Morev, politician, former mayor of Bălți
Ivan Calin, agronomist-scholar, political scientist, diplomat, politician, former Prime Minister of the Moldovan SSR, former acting President of the Moldovan Parliament
Veronica Abramciuc, historian, politician
Vasile Șova, politician, diplomat, former Minister for Reintegration
Constantin Starîș
Ivan Burgudji, founding member of Gagauz Halkı
Maxim Lebedinschi, politician
Zurab Todua - historian, politician, politologue, former member of the Parliament of Moldova
Andrei Stratan, politician, former Minister of Foreign Affairs
Dumitru Roibu, political activist
Valentin Beniuc, historian, politician, former Minister of Education
Alexandr Muravschi, economist, politician, former Minister of Economy
Corneliu Dudnic, politician
Andrei Safonov, politician, journalist, founding member of the Unity Movement for Equality in Rights
Mihail Kendighelean, politician, former President of Halk Topluşu
Petru Șornikov, historian, politician
Igor Tuleanțev, president of the "Fatherland - Eurasia Union" movement and leader of the Russian Youth League of Moldova
Vasile Bolea, politician, jurist, former professional rugby player
Andrei Neguța, politician
Artiom Lazarev, historian, politician
Valeriu Senic, historian, politician
Victor Pușcaș, politician, former Vice-president of the Parliament of Moldova
Alexandr Nesterovschi, jurist and politician, member of the Parliament of Moldova

Political parties and organizations
 Electoral Bloc of Communists and Socialists:
 Party of Communists of the Republic of Moldova
 Party of Socialists of the Republic of Moldova
 Șor Party
 Renato Usatîi Electoral Bloc: 
 Our Party
 Motherland Party
 Revival Party
 Greater Moldova Party
 Socialist Party of Moldova
 Party of Regions of Moldova
 Collective Action Party – Civic Congress
 Moldovan Antifa Movement
Russian Youth League of Moldova

Others 
 Marchel Mihăescu, bishop of Bălți and Fălești
 Sergiu Nazaria, historian
Ion Popușoi, botanist, academic, founder of the "Pro Moldova" movement
Vladislav Grosul, historian and a well-known supporter of Moldovenism

See also

 Bessarabian question
 Controversy over ethnic and linguistic identity in Moldova
 Moldova–Romania relations
 German reunification
 Korean reunification
 Reintegration of Transnistria into Moldova
 Irish reunification
 Greater Moldova
 Greater Romania
 "Bessarabia, Romanian land"
 Union of Bessarabia with Romania

References

Sources
 Lenore A. Grenoble (2003) Language Policy in the Soviet Union, Springer, 
 John Mackinlay, Peter Cross (2003) Regional Peacekeepers United Nations University Press 
 Charles King, "Moldovan Identity and the Politics of Pan-Romanianism", in Slavic Review, Vol. 53, No. 2. (Summer 1994), pp. 345–368.
 Charles King, The Moldovans: Romania, Russia, and the politics of culture, Hoover Institution Press, Stanford University, 2000.

External links

 Official website of Action 2012
 Romanism.net Website dedicated to Romanian-Moldovan reunification 
 BBC Romanian: "Interviu cu președintele PPCD Iurie Roșca" (March 2005)
 Ziua: "Trădarea Basarabiei de la București" (June 2005)
 HotNews: March 2006 Poll 
 Cotidianul: "Cîți bani ne-ar costa unirea cu Basarabia" (October 2006)
 Băsescu Plan: Actions supporting unification with Romania held in Chișinău (October 2006)

Moldova–Romania relations
Romania
Romanian irredentism
Greater Romania
Romania–Soviet Union relations
Romanian nationalism
Romanian nationalism in Moldova
Politics of Moldova
Politics of Romania
Politics of Transnistria
Proposed political unions
Proposals in Moldova
Proposals in Romania
Public policy proposals